Gustav Edén (29 December 1891 – 19 September 1966) was a Norwegian footballer. He played in one match for the Norway national football team in 1915.

References

External links
 
 

1891 births
1966 deaths
Norwegian footballers
Norway international footballers
People from Råde
Association football midfielders
Fredrikstad FK players